A parent artery is a medical term to describe an artery from which another artery originates.

It can also refer to the artery in which an aneurysm has occurred.

References 

Angiology